The 1910 Ole Miss Rebels football team represented the University of Mississippi during the 1910 college football season. Earl Kinnebrew was All-Southern.

Schedule

References

Ole Miss
Ole Miss Rebels football seasons
Ole Miss Rebels football